Bananana or Banananas may refer to:
 Bananana, a children's programming block on ntv7
 Bananana!, a children's programming block on 8tv
 Banananas Music, the record label for the Dutch band Luv'

See also 
Banana (disambiguation)